Paul Mackriell Copley (born 25 November 1944) is an English actor and voiceover artist. From 2011 to 2015 he appeared as Mr. Mason, father of William Mason, in 16 episodes of Downton Abbey, and from 2020 to 2021, he appeared in the ITV soap opera Coronation Street as Arthur Medwin.

Early life
Copley was born in Denby Dale, West Riding of Yorkshire, and grew up beside a dairy farm there. His father, Harold, was involved with local amateur dramatic productions, as were the rest of his family. He went to Penistone Grammar School, then to the Northern Counties College of Education in Newcastle upon Tyne, where he received an Associate of the Drama Board (ADB) in Drama. He taught English and Drama in Walthamstow, before he joined the Leeds Playhouse Theatre-in-education Company in 1971.

Career
Copley was the male lead character in the four-part BBC series Days of Hope in 1975, which depicted events between the First World War and the General Strike from a family involved in socialist politics.

In 1976, Copley won the Laurence Olivier Award for Actor of the Year in a New Play for his role in John Wilson's For King and Country.

After appearing as Private Wicks in the film A Bridge Too Far (1977), he played a small but noticeable role in Zulu Dawn (1979) as Cpl Storey in the British Army. He appeared in the then controversial ATV drama Death of a Princess (1980), playing a British witness to the killing of an Arabian princess and her lover. He has played Matthews in Hornblower, Ian in Roughnecks and Jerry in This Life and Peter Quinlan in The Lakes. In the critically acclaimed Queer as Folk he played Nathan Maloney's father. He was in Big Finish's July 2002 Doctor Who story Spare Parts and appeared in Shameless as a water sports enthusiast. In 1980 he appeared in the highly successful comedy drama series Minder playing George Palmer in episode The Old School Tie. He narrates the Channel 4 programme How Clean Is Your House?. He featured in the ITV children's hit show Best Friends in 2005–2006, playing the grandfather.

He is a regular actor in Radio 4 drama, usually in gritty or romantic plays or series about hard-working folk set in the north of England, often repeated on BBC Radio 4 Extra. Whenever a genial Yorkshire accent has been cast in the BBC radio drama department, he has often been summoned. Copley played the long-suffering teacher Geoff Long in Radio 4's long running King Street Junior. Covering ten series and some seventy-six episodes, this ran on BBC Radio 4 from 1985 to 1998. He also narrated the Yorkshire Television nine-part serial adaptation of The Pilgrim's Progress (1985) entitled Dangerous Journey.

On 13 February 2006, Copley appeared as an angry hostage-taker in an episode of the crime drama Life on Mars. Copley appeared in the TV Soap Coronation Street on 8 August 2007, portraying a character called Ivor Priestley, and in the TV adaptation of The Worst Witch by Jill Murphy, as wizard and former-frog Algernon Rowan-Webb.

From 1998 to 2003, Copley played Mathews in the Meridian Television series Hornblower. He appeared as Clement MacDonald in Children of Earth, the third series of BBC One show Torchwood, in 2009. The following year, he was seen in episodes of BBC One shows Casualty and Survivors.  From 2011 to 2015 he appeared as Mr. Mason, father of William Mason, in 16 episodes of Downton Abbey; in 2012, he played Alan in the television series White Heat.

Between 2012 and 2020 he played Harry in 5 seasons of the TV series Last Tango in Halifax. In 2014 he played the part of Malcolm Kenrich in the episode "On Harbour Street" of the TV series Vera.

In 2014 he narrated the Channel 5 programme The Railway – First Great Western of which there are 12 episodes. He also features as the father in Tom Wrigglesworth's Hang-Ups, a comedy on BBC Radio 4.

In 2016, he appeared in the BBC series The Coroner episode 2.4 "The Beast of Lighthaven" as John Roxwell.

In 2017, Copley appeared in Jimmy McGovern's acclaimed series Broken, Red Production Company's Trust Me, and in episode 5 of Doc Martin he played the eccentric Walter O'Donnell. He also took part in What Does an Idea Sound Like promoting the Veterans Work Campaign and narrated A Celebrity Taste of Italy for Channel 5.

In 2018, he played the role of Charlie Rainbird in the short film Thousand Yesterdays, currently in post production, and continues to voice Morrisons advertisements on radio and television in the UK.
Additionally in 2018, Copley played Charity Dingle's father Obadiah in Emmerdale.

On 7 February 2019, he made his first appearance as Leonard (Jill Archer's new love interest) in the BBC radio 4 soap Opera The Archers.

On 9 January 2020 he appeared as Feste in Father Brown on BBC1.

Personal life
He married the actress Natasha Pyne in 1972, after performing with her in a Leeds Playhouse production of Frank Wedekind's Lulu, adapted by Peter Barnes, directed by Bill Hays in 1971.

Filmography

Coronation Street (1972–2021) as Photographer/Ivor Priestley/Arthur Medwin
Alfie Darling (1975) as Bakey
A Bridge Too Far (1977) as Private Wicks
Treasure Island (1977) as Ben Gunn
Secret Army (1977) as Finch
Strangers (1978) as Des White
Zulu Dawn (1979) as Cpl. Storey
Jackanory (1980) as Storyteller
Doll's Eye (1982) as Social Worker
Gruey (1988) as Mr Grucock
War and Remembrance (1988) as Dagget
Gruey Twoey (1989) as Mr Grucock
Grange Hill (1989–1991) as St Joseph's Caretaker/Duncan Yeats
The Bill (1990–2010) as Various Roles
How's Business (1991) as Jack
Heartbeat (1992) as Dick Radcliffe 
The Remains of the Day (1993) as Harry Smith
Casualty (1995–2010) as Frederick Chambers/Mick McCarthur/Arthur Dixon
Jude (1996) as Mr. Willis
Hornblower: The Even Chance (1998) – Matthews
Hornblower: The Examination for Lieutenant (1998) as Matthews
Hornblower: The Duchess and the Devil (1999) as Matthews
Hornblower: The Frogs and the Lobsters (1999) as Matthews
The Worst Witch (1999) as Algernon Rowan-Webb
Holby City (1999–2019) as Jeff Jones/ Ross Saunders/Roger Keelan
Blow Dry (2001) as Ken
Hornblower: Mutiny (2002) as Matthews
Hornblower: Retribution (2002) as Matthews
Dalziel and Pascoe (2002) as Jack Henslowe
Hornblower: Loyalty (2003) as Matthews
Hornblower: Duty (2003) as Matthews
Johnny and the Bomb (2006) as Sgt Bourke
Life on Mars (2006) as Angry Hostage-Taker Reg Cole
Heartbeat (2004) as Herbie Lloyd
Heartbeat (2006) as Malcolm Stainsby
Doctors (2007–2018) as Various Roles
Torchwood: Children of Earth: (2009) as Clement McDonald
Downton Abbey (2011–2015) as Mr Mason
Last Tango in Halifax (2012–2020) as Harry
Midsomer Murders (2014) as Frank Dewar
Vera (2014) as Malcolm Kenrich 
Doc Martin (2017) as Walter O'Donnell
Emmerdale (2018) as Obadiah Dingle 
Father Brown (2020) as Feste
Doctors (2021) as Ernie Lynn
Downton Abbey: A New Era (2022) as Albert Mason

Radio

References

External links
 Official website
 
 Agency website

1944 births
English male television actors
English male voice actors
People from Denby Dale
Living people
Male actors from Yorkshire
People educated at Penistone Grammar School
Laurence Olivier Award winners